Doumbouya is a Guinean surname. Notable persons with this name include:

 Lonsana Doumbouya (born 1990), French-born Guinean footballer now playing in Austria, who has also played for Belgium and Scotland
 Mamady Doumbouya, colonel and leader of the 2021 Guinean coup d'état
 Mohamed Doumbouya (born 1978), Guinean footballer
 Sekou Doumbouya (born 2000), Guinean-born French basketball player